Bjørn Westergaard (born 12 September 1962, in Esbjerg) is a Danish Olympic sailor in the Finn class and Soling class sailor. Westergaard competed in the 1996 Summer Olympics, where he finished 21st.

He is the brother of Stig Westergaard.

References

Danish male sailors (sport)
Olympic sailors of Denmark
Finn class sailors
Sailors at the 1996 Summer Olympics – Finn
1962 births
Living people
Soling class world champions
People from Esbjerg
Sportspeople from the Region of Southern Denmark